The 1974 Sam Houston State Bearkats football team represented Sam Houston State University as a member of the Lone Star Conference (LSC) during the 1974 NAIA Division I football season. Led by first-year head coach Billy Tidwell, the Bearkats compiled an overall record of 2–8 with a mark of 4–5 in conference play, and finished tied for sixth in the LSC.

Schedule

References

Sam Houston State
Sam Houston Bearkats football seasons
Sam Houston State Bearkats football